Dachi (also Darchi, დარჩი, or Darchil, დარჩილი), of the Chosroid Dynasty, was the king of Iberia (Kartli, eastern Georgia) reigning, according to a medieval Georgian literary tradition, for 12 years, from c. 522 to 534. He was given a territorial epithet Ujarmeli (უჯარმელი, i.e., "of/from Ujarma") for having spent years at his residence at Ujarma.

The name Dachi derives from Middle Persian Dārčīhr, itself being a compound of the Iranian words dar ("court, palace") and čihr[ag] ("seed, origin").

According to the medieval Georgian chronicles, Dachi was the eldest son of King Vakhtang I Gorgasal by Balendukht, daughter of the Iranian Sassanid king Hormizd III. He succeeded his father, who had launched an abortive rebellion against the Sassanid hegemony, and took a more conciliatory line with his Iranian suzerains. From his base at Ujarma in Kakheti, which had constituted the royal demesne from the days of the early Chosroids, he spent special missionary efforts to further Christianize his mountainous subjects. He also enlarged the town of Tbilisi and completed the construction of its citadel which had been founded by his father. Dachi was succeeded by his son, Bacurius II.

References

 

Chosroid kings of Iberia
530s deaths
6th-century monarchs in Asia
Year of birth unknown
Georgian people of Iranian descent
Georgians from the Sasanian Empire